Le Cornelle is a zoo and amusement park in Valbrembo, in the Lombardy province, northern Italy, created by Angelo Ferruccio Benedetti in 1981; extending over an area of 100,000 square metres.

Description
The purpose of the park is to preserve wildlife in captivity, according to the project EEP (European Endangered Species Programme), to which the park has adopted from the foundation.
The animals live in enclosures that reconstruct the environment of origin, and reproduce themselves: the puppies are reintroduced in the original places of origin, according to the guidelines of the project.
The park is the home of 1,000 animals belonging to 120 different species, including mammals, birds and reptiles.
Le Cornelles has besides the largest aviary in Italy, called "Selva Tropicale", it's an area of 7,000 m2, closed by a grid placed on high poles to prevent the flight of birds, which live in a state of semi-freedom.

Mammals

Birds

Reptiles

Gallery

External links

References 

Zoos in Italy
Zoos established in 1981